Ctenochirichthys longimanus is a species of dreamer known only from the eastern Pacific Ocean in deep waters off the coast of Chile.  This species is the only known member of its genus.

References
 

Oneirodidae
Taxa named by Charles Tate Regan
Taxa named by Ethelwynn Trewavas
Fish described in 1932